Hecht is a pop rock band hailing from Lucerne, Switzerland. One of their albums and one of their singles have been awarded gold status in Switzerland and all their full-length albums were in the national charts for multiple weeks. They perform in the band's native Swiss German language.

History
Together with Rolf Furrer, Stefan Buck and Cristoph Schröter founded the Band Seng, that would later be renamed to Hecht, in the year 2000 in Lucerne. Buck and Schröter were already acquainted with each other from growing up in the same village. In the band's early years their music was performed in English. From 2010 onward they started experimenting with music in the Swiss German language.

In 2011 Philipp Morscher and Daniel Gisler became part of the band. This is also the year in which they changed their name to Hecht and they released their first songs in Swiss German called Tänzer and 24 Bilder as well as the EP Revier Songs. As support group for Baschi and 77 Bombay Street Hecht got introduced to a broader audience.
In May 2012 the band released their first full-length album called Wer zerscht s'Meer gsehd. It peaked at number 72 in the Swiss charts. Following this, the band won in the category Best Talent National at the Swiss Music Awards.

In 2015 they contributed the official song for SRF bewegt, a week long health campaign from the Swiss national broadcasting station SRF and the Federal Offices of health, sport and energy.

On 28 August in the same year, their second album Adam + Eva was released. It entered the chart on number 5.

On 9 March 2018 the bands most successful album Oh Boy was released. It peaked at number 2 of the charts and received favourable critique in the press.

On 28 October 2019 Hecht played their largest concert to this day in the Hallenstadion Zurich. During the preparations for this concert the band was accompanied by a film crew and a documentary of it was broadcast on 24 November on the television channel SRF 1

Music videos
Hecht is known for their original and energetic music and live videos in which the band members perform dance choreographies. The band has worked together with the Zurich-based film-producer Claude Gabriel with whom they created videos for their songs Surfer, Heicho, Kawasaki and Prosecco.

Discography

Albums
 Revier Songs (EP, 2012)
 Wer zerscht s’Meer gsehd (2012)
 Adam + Eva (2015)
 Oh Boy (2018)
 Live im Hallenstadion (2020)

Singles
 24 Bilder (2011)
 Tanze tanze (2012)
 Gymnastique (2015)
 Kawasaki (2017)
 Besch ready für die Liebi vo mer? (2019)
 Gsehnd üs im Sommer (2020)
 Nur 1 Minute (2020)
 Prosecco (2021)
 Nimm Mech I Arm (2021)

Awards
 2013: Swiss Music Awards Best Talent National
 2017: Swiss Music Awards Best Live Act
 2020: Swiss Music Awards Best Live Act

References

Swiss pop rock music groups